Achak may refer to:
Achak, Iran, a village
Maryam Achak, Iranian fencer